Hellmuth Dieter Küchenmeister (13 October 1935 - 22 September 2011) was an Austrian male curler and sports executive.

At the national level, he is a five-time Austrian men's champion curler.

In the 1950s and 1960s he was an ice hockey player for EC Kitzbühel, winning silver and bronze medals at the Austrian championship.

As a sports executive, he was co-founder of Austrian Curling Federation in 1980, long-time president of Kitzbühel Curling Club and long-time director of the Austrian Open Kitzbühel international tennis tournament.

Teams

References

External links

1935 births
Sportspeople from Chemnitz
People from Kitzbühel
2011 deaths
Austrian male curlers
Austrian curling champions
Sports executives and administrators
Austrian ice hockey players
Sportspeople from Tyrol (state)
20th-century Austrian people